Gokamura-ike Dam (五ヶ村池) is an earthfill dam located in Aichi Prefecture in Japan. The dam is used for irrigation. The catchment area of the dam is 0.6 km2. The dam impounds about 2  ha of land when full and can store 105 thousand cubic meters of water. The construction of the dam was started on 1972 and completed in 1974.

References

Dams in Aichi Prefecture
1974 establishments in Japan